Lyon's Pride is a 1994 novel by Anne McCaffrey, which continues the storyline begun in Damia's Children. It was published by Ace in the US/Canada, and Bantam in the UK.

Humans and their alien allies the Mrdini slowly begin to get the upper hand in their war against the voracious Hivers, with the help of the powerful psychic Talents of the Raven-Lyon family. The novel also describes some of the tensions between humanity and the Mrdini, and describes why the 'Dini have such a different attitude toward war and death than humans.

The conclusion of the Hiver War is told in The Tower and the Hive.

References

External links

1994 American novels
1994 science fiction novels
Novels by Anne McCaffrey
To Ride Pegasus
Fictional telepaths